London Designer Outlet (abbreviated LDO) is a semi-outdoor shopping centre in Wembley in the London Borough of Brent. Located on Wembley Park Boulevard adjacent to both Wembley Stadium and The SSE Arena, it opened in 2013 as the first outlet centre in Greater London.

History
It officially opened on 24 October 2013, London's first outlet exclusive centre, as part of the  Wembley Park Redevelopment project by owners Quintain. The development cost £65 million.

As of late 2018, total revenues at London Designer Outlet have risen 97% since its opening, and it attracts 7 million visitors a year.

Retail area

Along with this the outlet centre also has space for events which is used during seasonal time periods, most recently to screen the Royal Wedding, Wimbledon and the World Cup, though it is also used for music and cultural events as well. LDO's 20 coffee shops and restaurants provide 2,000 covers and there is also a nine-screen, 1,800 seat Cineworld cinema. BREEAM Retail gave it a ‘Very Good’ rating as well as a ‘Very Positive’ on Brent's Sustainable Development Checklist.

With its location next to Wembley Stadium and its line-up of well-known brands, LDO is becoming famous for its 'athleisure' stores, though its top performers reflect its greater diversity and include one of the top Gap outlet stores in Europe, one of the top Nike outlet stores in Europe and the top Guess outlet store in Europe. It opened UK 'firsts' for outlet stores from H&M, Converse, and Haribo.

London Designer Outlet became the first shopping centre in the UK to offer 'store to door' delivery via DropIt with delivery within 24 hours to any postal code in mainland Britain, for a flat rate of £10.50 for an unlimited number of LDO shopping bags condensed into one delivery.

Transport

Trains
Wembley Stadium station for Chiltern Railways is located some 300 yards from London Designer Outlet, while Wembley Park tube station on the Jubilee line and Metropolitan line is half a mile away, accessed through Wembley Park Boulevard and Olympic Way. In addition, Wembley Central station for Southern Railways, London Overground, and the Bakerloo line, is also less than a mile from the centre.

Buses
The centre is served by London Buses routes 83, 92, 182, 206, 223,  297 and 483.

Parking

LDO has a 1,000-space multi-storey "Red" Car Park, located opposite its main entrance. This car park is also used by Wembley Stadium and The SSE Arena on event days.

In popular culture
In November 2015, British Rapper Tion Wayne filmed a music video for his single Be Like That at the outlet centre.

References

External links
 Official Website

Redevelopment projects in London
Shopping centres in the London Borough of Brent
Tourist attractions in the London Borough of Brent
Shopping malls established in 2013
2013 establishments in England
Wembley
Privately owned public spaces
Outlet malls in England